Reba McEntire's Greatest Hits is Reba McEntire's first compilation for MCA Records.  It covers her hit singles from 1984, 1985 and 1986.  No new material was recorded for the album.  Greatest Hits peaked at No. 2 on the country album chart and at No. 134 on the Billboard 200.  It has sold well over time and is currently certified three-times platinum by the RIAA.

Track listing

Charts

Weekly charts

Year-end charts

Certifications and sales

References

1987 greatest hits albums
Reba McEntire compilation albums
MCA Records compilation albums